is a regional bank that mainly operates in Nara Prefecture, Japan. The bank, established in June 1934, has 136 domestic branches in Nara, Osaka, Kyoto, Hyogo, Mie, Wakayama, and Tokyo as well as representative offices in Hong Kong and Shanghai, China.

The Nanto Bank commands 48.4% of all deposits and 50.5% of all lending in Nara Prefecture that mainly serves as bedroom communities for neighboring Osaka, with a population of 1,421,000. The total assets of the bank reached 4.61 trillion yen as of March 2009.

The bank provides general banking services such as deposits, loans, and exchange transactions, as well as other financial services including securities brokerage, letter of credit, credit cards, leasing, and software development. Due to the recent shrinking tendency in population in Nara, the strategy of the Nanto Bank is to seek growth in neighboring Osaka while providing wealth management products to the retail banking market in Nara.

Major Stockholders 
As of March 31, 2015, the top 10 stockholders of Nanto Bank are:

References

External links 
 Information Meeting / Annual Report

Banks established in 1934
Regional banks of Japan
Companies listed on the Tokyo Stock Exchange
Companies listed on the Osaka Exchange
Meiji Yasuda Life
1934 establishments in Japan